The Cérou is an  long river in the Aveyron and Tarn departments in southern France. It flows generally west-northwest.

Departments and communes along its course
It flows generally west through the following departments and communes, ordered from source to mouth:
 Aveyron: Saint-Jean-Delnous, Lédergues
 Tarn: Lédas-et-Penthiès, Lacapelle-Pinet, Padiès, Crespin, Andouque, Saint-Jean-de-Marcel, Valderiès, Rosières, Carmaux, Saint-Benoît-de-Carmaux, Monestiés, Le Ségur, Salles, Saint-Marcel-Campes, Cordes-sur-Ciel, Les Cabannes, Mouzieys-Panens, Vindrac-Alayrac, Labarthe-Bleys, Marnaves, Milhars

Tributaries
The Farruel (12.5 km), the Boutescure (15.4 km), the Céroc (17.6 km), the Candou, the Céret (28.5 km), the Zère, the Aymer (12,2 km), and the Bonnan.

References

Rivers of France
Rivers of Occitania (administrative region)
Rivers of Aveyron
Rivers of Tarn (department)